Aqcheh Qaleh (also Romanized as Āqcheh Qal‘eh; also known as Aghcheh Ghaleh, Aqjaqleh, and Āqjeh Qal‘eh) is a village in Bayat Rural District, Nowbaran District, Saveh County, Markazi Province, Iran. At the 2006 census, its population was 584, in 150 families.

References 

Populated places in Saveh County